Qilpenlui-ye Olya (also Romanized as Qīlpenlūī-ye ‘Olyā; also known as Qīlpenlū-ye ‘Olyā and Qīl Penlū-ye ‘Olyā) is a village in Naqdi Rural District, Meshgin-e Sharqi District, Meshgin Shahr County, Ardabil Province, Iran. At the 2006 census, its population was 30, in 8 families.

References 

Towns and villages in Meshgin Shahr County